Kymi-Aliveri is a municipality in the Euboea regional unit, Central Greece, Greece. The seat of the municipality is the town Aliveri. The municipal unit has an area of 804.983 km2.

Municipality
The municipality Kymi-Aliveri was formed at the 2011 local government reform by the merger of the following 5 former municipalities, that became municipal units:
Avlon
Dystos
Konistres
Kymi
Tamyneoi

References

Municipalities of Central Greece
Populated places in Euboea